Pimelea filifolia is a species of flowering plant in the family Thymelaeaceae and is endemic to Arnhem Land in the Northern Territory of Australia. It is an erect herb with thread-like leaves and clusters of pale pink flowers.

Description
Flowering occurs between February and July.

Taxonomy
This species was first formally described in 1990 by Barbara Lynette Rye who gave it the name Thecanthes filifolia in the Flora of Australia from specimens collected by Clyde Dunlop. In 2016, Charles S.P. Foster and Murray J. Henwood changed the name to Pimelea filifolia in Australian Systematic Botany. The specific epithet (filifolia) means "thread-leaved".

Distribution and habitat
Pimelea filifolia grows in sandy soil on sandstone pavement, usually near watercourses, from the far north to near Katherine, in Arnhem Land.

Conservation status
Pimelea filifolia is listed as "least" under the Northern Territory Territory Parks and Wildlife Conservation Act.

References

filifolia
Malvales of Australia
Flora of the Northern Territory
Plants described in 1990
Taxa named by Barbara Lynette Rye